The yellow-bellied mud turtle (Pelusios castanoides) is a species of turtle in the family Pelomedusidae. It is found in Madagascar, Malawi, Mozambique, Seychelles, South Africa, and Tanzania.

Subspecies
 P. c. castanoides 
 P. c. intergularis

References 

Hewitt, John 1931. Descriptions of some African tortoises. Annals of the Natal Museum 6:461-506, pls. XXXVI–XXXVIII.
 Tortoise & Freshwater Turtle Specialist Group 1996.  Pelusios castanoides.   2006 IUCN Red List of Threatened Species  Downloaded on 29 July 2007.

Bibliography

yellow-bellied mud turtle
Reptiles of East Africa
Reptiles of Madagascar
yellow-bellied mud turtle
Taxonomy articles created by Polbot